The Paris Opera is the primary opera and ballet company of France. Classical ballet as it is known today arose within the Paris Opera as the Paris Opera Ballet and has remained an integral and important part of the company. Small scale and contemporary works are also staged in the 500-seat Amphitheatre under the Opéra Bastille.

The company's annual budget is in the order of 200 million euros, of which €100M come from the French state and €70M from box office receipts. With this money, the company runs the two houses and supports a large permanent staff, which includes the orchestra of 170, a chorus of 110 and the corps de ballet of 150.

Each year, the Paris Opera presents about 380 performances of opera, ballet and other concerts, to a total audience of about 800,000 people (of whom 17% come from abroad), with an average seat occupancy rate of 94%. In the 2012–2013 season, the Paris Opera presented 18 opera titles (two in a double bill), 13 ballets, 5 symphonic concerts and two vocal recitals, plus 15 other programmes. The company's training bodies are also active, with 7 concerts from the Atelier Lyrique and 4 programmes from the École de Danse.

History

The Opera under Louis XIV

Pierre Perrin

The poet Pierre Perrin began thinking and writing about the possibility of French opera in 1655, more than a decade before the official founding of the Paris Opera as an institution. He believed that the prevailing opinion of the time that the French language was fundamentally unmusical was completely incorrect. Seventeenth-century France offered Perrin essentially two types of organization for realizing his vision: a royal academy or a public theater. In 1666 he proposed to the minister Colbert that "the king decree 'the establishment of an Academy of Poetry and Music' whose goal would be to synthesize the French language and French music into an entirely new lyric form."

Even though Perrin's original concept was of an academy devoted to discussions of French opera, the king's intention was in fact a unique hybrid of royal academy and public theatre, with an emphasis on the latter as an institution for performance. On 28 June 1669, Louis XIV signed the Privilège accordé au Sieur Perrin pour l'établissement d'une Académie d'Opéra en musique, & Vers François (Privilege granted to Sir Perrin for the establishment of an Academy of Opera in music, & French Verse). The wording of the privilège, based in part on Perrin's own writings, gave him the exclusive right for 12 years to found anywhere in France academies of opera dedicated to the performance of opera in French. He was free to select business partners of his choice and to set the price of tickets. No one was to have the right of free entry including members of the royal court, and no one else could set up a similar institution. Although it was to be a public theatre, it retained its status as royal academy in which the authority of the king as the primary stakeholder was decisive. The monopoly, originally intended to protect the enterprise from competition during its formative phase, was renewed for subsequent recipients of the privilege up to the early French Revolution. As Victoria Johnson points out, "the Opera was an organization by nature so luxurious and expensive in its productions that its very survival depended on financial protection and privilege."

Perrin converted the Bouteille tennis court, located on the Rue des Fossés de Nesles (now 42 Rue Mazarine), into a rectangular facility with provisions for stage machinery and scenery changes and a capacity of about 1200 spectators.

Jean-Baptiste Lully

The institution was renamed the Académie Royale de Musique and came to be known in France simply as the Opéra. Within one month Lully had convinced the king to expand the privilege by restricting the French and Italian comedians to using two singers rather than six, and six instrumentalists, rather than twelve. Because of legal difficulties Lully could not use the Salle de la Bouteille, and a new theatre was built by Carlo Vigarani at the Bel-Air tennis court on the Rue de Vaugirard. Later, Lully and his successors bitterly negotiated the concession of the privilege, in whole or in part, from the entrepreneurs in the provinces: in 1684 Pierre Gautier bought the authorisation to open a music academy in Marseille, then the towns of Lyon, Rouen, Lille and Bordeaux followed suit in the following years. During Lully's tenure, the only works performed were his own. The first productions were the pastorale Les fêtes de l'Amour et de Bacchus (November 1672) and his first tragedie lyrique called Cadmus et Hermione (27 April 1673).

After Molière's death in 1673, his troupe merged with the players at the Théâtre du Marais to form the Théâtre Guénégaud (at the same theatre that had been used by the Académie d'Opéra), and no longer needed the theatre built by Richelieu at his residence the Palais-Royal, near the Louvre. (In 1680 the troupe at the Guénégaud merged again with the players from the Hôtel de Bourgogne forming the Comédie-Française.) Richelieu's theatre had been designed by Jacques Le Mercier and had opened in 1641, and unlike the huge theatre at the Tuileries Palace, which could accommodate 6,000 to 8,000 spectators, was of a size consistent with good acoustics. Lully greatly desired a better theatre and persuaded the king to let him use the one at the Palais-Royal free of charge. The Théâtre du Palais-Royal had been altered in 1660 and 1671, but Lully, with 3,000 livres received from the king, had further changes made by Vigarani in 1674.

The first production in the new theatre was Alceste on 19 January 1674. The opera was bitterly attacked by those enraged at the restrictions that Lully had caused to be placed on the French and Italian comedians. To mitigate the damage, Louis XIV arranged for new works to be premiered at the court, usually at the Chateau Vieux of the Château de Saint-Germain-en-Laye. This had the further advantage of subsidizing the cost of rehearsals, as well as most of the machinery, sets, and costumes, which were donated to the Opéra for use in Paris. During Lully's time at the Opéra, performances were given all year, except for three weeks at Easter. Regular performances were on Tuesdays, Fridays, and Sundays. The premieres presented at court were usually during Carnival and were moved to the Palais-Royal after Easter, where the openings were on Thursdays. About two to three new works were mounted each year. In all, thirteen of Lully's tragédie en musique were performed there (see the list of compositions by Jean-Baptiste Lully).

After Lully

After Lully died (in 1687), the number of new works per year almost doubled, since his successors (Pascal Collasse, Henri Desmarets, André Campra, André Cardinal Destouches, and Marin Marais) had greater difficulty sustaining the interest of the public. Revivals of Lully's works were common. French composers at the Opéra generally wrote music to new librettos, which had to be approved by the directors of the company. The Italian practice of preparing new settings of existing librettos was considered controversial and did not become the norm in Paris until around 1760. One of the most important of the new works during this period was an opéra-ballet by Campra called L'Europe galante presented in 1697.

Ballet
In 1661 Louis XIV, who was a dancer himself and one of the great architects of baroque ballet (the art form which would one day evolve into classical ballet), established the Académie Royale de Danse, intended to codify court and character dances and to certify dance teachers by examination. From 1680 until Lully's death, it was under the direction of the great dancing master Pierre Beauchamp, the man who codified the five positions of the feet. When Lully took over the Opéra in 1672, he and Beauchamp made theatrical ballet an important part of the company's productions. The ballet of that time was merely an extension of the opera, having yet to evolve into an independent form of theatrical art. As it became more important, however, the dance component of the company began to be referred to as the Paris Opera Ballet. In 1713 an associated ballet school was opened, today known as the Paris Opera Ballet School. The Académie Royale de Danse remained separate, and with the fall of the monarchy in 1789 it disappeared.

The company's names after the Revolution

With the French Revolution and the founding of the Republic, the company changed names several times, dropping its association with the royal family (see the List of official company names for details), and in 1794, moved into the Théâtre National de la rue de la Loi (capacity 2800) where it took the name Théâtre des Arts. In 1797, it was renamed the Théâtre de la République et des Arts.

Napoleon took control of the company in 1802 and with the declaration of the French Empire in 1804, renamed the company the Académie Impériale de Musique. With the Restoration in 1814, the company was renamed the Académie Royale de Musique. It became part of the Académie des Beaux-Arts in 1816. In 1821, the company moved to the Salle Le Peletier, which had a capacity of 1900 spectators and where it remained until the building was destroyed by fire in 1873.

In the second half of the 19th century, with the ascension of Napoleon III in 1851, the name Académie Impériale de Musique was reinstated and after 1870 with the formation of the Third Republic, was changed to Théâtre National de l'Opéra.

In 1875, the institution occupied a new home, the Palais Garnier. Between 1908 and 1914 Henri Benjamin Rabaud conducted at Palais Garnier. Rabaud also composed several works which first premiered at Opéra-Comique, but were later also performed at Palais Garnier.

In 1939, the Opéra was merged with the Opéra-Comique and the company name became Réunion des Théâtres Lyriques Nationaux. The Opéra-Comique was closed in 1972 with the appointment of Rolf Liebermann as general administrator of the Théâtre National de l'Opéra de Paris (1973–1980), but in 1976, the Opéra-Comique was restored.

In 1990, the Opéra moved its primary venue to the new Opéra-Bastille, becoming the Opéra de Paris, although it continued to mount productions, primarily ballet, at the Palais Garnier; and the Opéra-Comique regained its autonomy. In 1994 the Opéra de Paris became the Opéra National de Paris. Regardless of all the changes in its "official" name, the company and its theatres were commonly referred to as the Opéra.

The current managing director of the Opéra is Alexander Neef, since September 2020.  Past principal conductors and music directors of the Opéra have included Myung-whun Chung, James Conlon and Philippe Jordan.  In April 2021, the Opéra announced the appointment of Gustavo Dudamel as its next music director, effective 1 August 2021, with an initial contract of 6 seasons.

Gallery

List of official company names

List of venues

List of managing directors

Other Parisian opera companies and theatres 
In the period from 1725 to 1791 there were essentially four public theatres which were permitted in Paris:
Opéra de Paris
Comédie-Française
Comédie-Italienne
Opéra-Comique
In 1762, the Opéra-Comique merged with the Comédie-Italienne.

In 1791, the laws were changed allowing almost anyone to open a public theatre. This led to rapid growth in the number of theatres and companies and complexities in their naming. Theatres might burn down and be rebuilt using the name of an old or new company or patron. Some of the new theatres that appeared during this period include:

Théâtre Feydeau
Théâtre Italien
Théâtre Lyrique
Théâtre de l'Ambigu-Comique
Théâtre des Bouffes-Parisiens
Cirque Olympique
Théâtre de la Gaîté
Gymnase-Dramatique
Théâtre des Nouveautés
Théâtre de l'Odeon
Porte-St-Martin
Théâtre de la Renaissance
Théâtre des Variétés
Théâtre du Vaudeville

After about 1870, the situation was simpler with regard to opera, with primarily the Opéra and the Opéra-Comique in operation. The naming situation became somewhat confusing after the Opéra-Comique's theater (the second Salle Favart) burned on 25 May 1887, since the company began performing in other locations. Companies other than the Opéra producing operas or operettas at various theatres in this period included:

Opéra-Comique at Salle Favart (2), Théâtre Lyrique, Théâtre du Château-d'Eau, Salle Favart (3)
Opéra National Lyrique at Théâtre de la Gaîté
Eden-Théâtre (Lohengrin, 1887)
Opéra Populaire performing at Théâtre du Châtelet, Théâtre de la Gaîté, and Théâtre du Château-d'Eau
Théâtre du Château-d'Eau
Théâtre Lyrique performing at Salle de l'Athénée, Théâtre du Château-d'Eau, and Théâtre de la Renaissance
Nouveau-Lyrique at Théâtre Taitbout
Théâtre de l'Odéon (plays with incidental music by, e.g. Bizet, Fauré)
Théâtre de la Ville
Théâtre du Châtelet
Théâtre des Champs-Élysées

See also 

List of theatres and entertainment venues in Paris
Opéra (Paris Métro)
:Category:Opera world premieres at the Paris Opera
The Phantom of the Opera

References

Notes

Cited sources
 Astier, Régine (1998a). "Académie Royale de Danse" in Cohen 1998, vol. 1, pp. 3–5.
 Astier, Régine (1998b). "Beauchamps, Pierre" in Cohen 1998, vol. 1, pp. 396–397.
 Charlton, David, editor (2003). The Cambridge Companion to Grand Opera. Cambridge, UK: Cambridge University Press. 
 Charlton, David (2014). "New Light on the Bouffons in Paris (1752–1754)", Eighteenth-Century Music, vol. 11, no. 1, pp. 31–54.
 Christout, Marie-Françoise (1998). "Paris Opera Ballet" in Cohen 1998, vol. 5, pp. 86–100.
 Cohen, Selma Jeanne, editor (1998). International Encyclopedia of Dance. Oxford: Oxford University Press.  (hardcover).  (2004 paperback edition).
 Costonis, Maureen Needham (1992). "Beauchamps [Beauchamp] Pierre" in Sadie (1992) 1: 364.
 Craine, Debra; Mackrell, Judith (2000). The Oxford Dictionary of Dance. Oxford: Oxford University Press. .
 Fauser, Annegret, editor; Everist, Mark, editor (2009). Music, Theater, and Cultural Transfer. Paris, 1830–1914. Chicago: The University of Chicago Press. .
 Fontaine, Gerard (2003). Visages de marbre et d'airain: La collection de bustes du Palais Garnier. Paris: Monum, Éditions du patrimoine. .
 Fulcher, Jane (1987). The Nation's Image: French Grand Opera as Politics and Politicized Art. Cambridge: Cambridge University Press. .
 Gerhard, Anselm (1998). The Urbanization of Opera: Music theatre in Paris in the Nineteenth Century, translated from French to English by Mary Whittall. Chicago: University of Chicago Press. .
 Gourret, Jean (1985). Histoire des Salles de l'Opéra de Paris. Paris: Guy Trédaniel. .
 Guest, Ivor (2008). The Romantic Ballet in Paris. Alton, Hampshire, UK: Dance Books. .
 Johnson, Victoria (2008). Backstage at the Revolution: How the Royal Paris Opera Survived the End of the Old Regime. Chicago: The University of Chicago Press. .
 Levin, Alicia (2009). "A documentary overview of musical theaters in Paris, 1830–1900" in Fauser 2009, pp. 379–402.
 Pitou, Spire (1983). The Paris Opéra: An Encyclopedia of Operas, Ballets, Composers, and Performers. Genesis and Glory, 1671–1715. Westport, Connecticut: Greenwood Press. .
 Pitou, Spire (1985). The Paris Opera: An Encyclopedia of Operas, Ballets, Composers, and Performers. Rococo and Romantic, 1715–1815. Westport, Connecticut: Greenwood Press. .
 Pitou, Spire (1990). The Paris Opéra: An Encyclopedia of Operas, Ballets, Composers, and Performers. Growth and Grandeur, 1815–1914. New York: Greenwood Press. .
 Powell, John S. (2000). Music and Theatre in France 1600–1680. Oxford: Oxford University Press. .
 Sadie, Stanley, editor (1992). The New Grove Dictionary of Opera (4 volumes). London: Macmillan. .
 Sadie, Stanley, editor; John Tyrell; executive editor (2001). The New Grove Dictionary of Music and Musicians, 2nd edition. London: Macmillan.  (hardcover).  (eBook).
 Walton, William (1899). Paris from the Earliest Period to the Present Day, vol. 3. Philadelphia: George Barrie & Son. View at Google Books.
 Wild, Nicole (1989). Dictionnaire des théâtres parisiens au XIXe siècle: les théâtres et la musique. Paris: Aux Amateurs de livres. .  (paperback). View formats and editions at WorldCat.
 Wolff, Stéphane (1962). L'Opéra au Palais Garnier (1875–1962). Paris: Deposé au journal L'Entr'acte . Paris: Slatkine (1983 reprint) .

Other sources
 Chouquet, Gustave (1873). Histoire de la musique dramatique en France (in French), pp. 309–425. Paris: Didot. View at Google Books.
 Durey de Noinville, Jacques-Bernard (1753–1757). Histoire du Théâtre de l'opéra en France (2 volumes). Paris: Joseph Barbou. Vols. 1 and 2 at Google Books.
 Gourret, Jean (1982). Dictionnaire des chanteurs de l'Opéra de Paris. Paris: Albatros. View formats and editions at WorldCat.
 Gourret, Jean (1987). Dictionnaire des cantatrices de l'Opéra de Paris. Paris: Albatros. .
 Lajarte, Théodore (1878). Bibliothèque musicale du Théâtre de l'Opéra, volume 1 [1671–1791]. Paris: Librairie des Bibliophiles. View at Google Books.
 Lajarte, Théodore de (1878). Bibliothèque musicale du Théâtre de l'Opéra, volume 2 [1793–1876]. Paris: Librairie des Bibliophiles. View at Google Books.
 Lasalle, Albert de (1875). Les treize salles de lOpéra. Paris: Sartorius. View at Internet Archive. View at Google Books.
 Nuitter, Charles; Thoinan, Ernest (1886). Les Origines de l'Opéra français (in French). Paris: E. Plon, Nourrit et Cie. Copies 1 and 2 at Google Books.
 Pougin, Arthur (1881). Les vrais créateurs de l'opéra français, Perrin et Cambert. Paris: Charavay Frères. Copy at Gallica.

External links

Official website

 
Music schools in Paris
Arts and culture in the Ancien Régime
Institut de France
1669 establishments in France
French opera companies
Opera history
Theatres completed in 1669
Opera in France